
Sasia is a genus of birds in the woodpecker family Picidae, that are native to the Old World. They are very small, virtually tailless woodpeckers, with a crombec or nuthatch-like appearance and foraging habits. Their habitat is forest and secondary growth.

These species have a flesh orbital ring and a rounded (in cross-section) upper mandible. They have ten rectrices and only three toes (absent first digit, or hallux).

The African piculet has sometimes been included in this genus. It has only eight rectrices and four toes in a zygodactyl arrangement (a weak first digit). It differs from the Asian species in the plumage colour of the adult, but not in the plumage pattern, body anatomy or in habits.

Species
The genus contains the following two species:

Gallery

References

 
Bird genera
Taxonomy articles created by Polbot